Kenan Bargan ( Kenán Mpargkán, born 25 October 1988) is a Greek professional footballer who plays as a winger.

Early life
Bargan was born in Xanthi, Thrace to Pomak Muslim parents.

Club career

Veria
In 2010 aged 21 Bargan made his first big career move moving to Veria. Bargan remained at Veria for 5 years and played 4 years in the Superleague with them.

Kalloni
Bargan left Veria and moved to Kalloni however only stayed there for 6 months making 13 appearances and scoring 2 goals

Panionios
Bargan then moved to Panionios and was given the number 10 jersey. Once again only stayed for 6 months but was a crucial player in Panionios' run to a 5th place finish and played 15 games for Panionios.

Aris
Bargan requested to be released from his contract at Panionios and was granted a release. After weeks of negotiations with Aris on transfer deadline day Bargan made his biggest career move and moved to Aris. On 29 November 2016, he scored his first goal against Asteras Tripoli in the Greek Cup. On 5 December 2016, he scored his first league goal against Kalloni. On 10 December he scored another goal in an away win against Panelefsiniakos. On the 18th of December Bargan scored in his 4th straight game in a 3-2 win over Trikala. On 22 January 2017 he netted another one against Acharnaikos. On 17 July 2017, he extended his contract for 2 years. On 31 August 2018, he terminated his contract by mutual consent.

AEL
On 11 September 2018, he signed a two-year contract with AEL. On 30 October 2018, he scored a brace in a comfortable 4-1 home win against Irodotos for the Greek Cup.

On 1 December 2018, he was the MVP of an emphatic 4-2 home win against Panionios, scoring one goal and giving two assists.

Career statistics

Club

Honours

Veria
Football League: Runner-up: 2011-12

References

External links
 
 OnSports
 Goal.com
 

1988 births
Living people
Greek footballers
Bulgarian footballers
Greek people of Bulgarian descent
Greek Muslims
Bulgarian Muslims
Pomaks
Super League Greece players
Football League (Greece) players
Veria F.C. players
AEL Kalloni F.C. players
Aris Thessaloniki F.C. players
Panionios F.C. players
Athlitiki Enosi Larissa F.C. players
Apollon Pontou FC players
Association football wingers
Footballers from Xanthi